There is also a Diocese of Curitiba (and a Bishop of Curitiba) in the Anglican Episcopal Church of Brazil.

The Roman Catholic Archdiocese of Curitiba is a Latin rite Metropolitan archdiocese in Paraná, southern Brazil.

Its cathedral archiepiscopal see is a Minor Basilica: Catedral Metropolitana Basílica Nossa Senhora da Luz dos Pinhais, dedicated to Our Lady of the Candles, in Curitiba.

History 
 April 27, 1892: Established as Diocese of Curitiba / Curitiben(sis) (Latin), on territory split off from the then Diocese of São Paulo (now Metropolitan) 
 Lost territory on 1908.03.19 to establish the Diocese of Santa Catarina
 Promoted on May 10, 1926 as Metropolitan Archdiocese of Curitiba / Curitiben(sis) (Latin), having lost territories to establish Territorial Prelature of Foz do Iguaçu, Diocese of Jacarezinho and Diocese of Ponta Grossa (as a suffragan)
 Lost territories repeatedly to establish three more suffragan sees : on 1962.07.21 Diocese of Paranaguá, on 1976.12.03 Diocese of União da Vitória and on 2006.12.06 Diocese of São José dos Pinhais
 It enjoyed a Papal visit from Pope John Paul II in July 1980.

Statistics 
As per 2014, it pastorally served 1,835,000 Catholics (71.6% of 2,562,464 total) on 5,751 km² in 135 parishes and 572 missions with 407 priests (100 diocesan, 307 religious), 70 deacons, 1,527 lay religious (614 brothers, 913 sisters) and 33 seminarians.

Ecclesiastical province 
The Metropolitan has the following suffragan sees :
 Roman Catholic Diocese of Guarapuava
 Roman Catholic Diocese of Paranaguá, a daughter
 Roman Catholic Diocese of Ponta Grossa, a daughter
 Roman Catholic Diocese of São José dos Pinhais, a daughter
 Roman Catholic Diocese of União da Vitória, a daughter

Episcopal ordinaries, along with auxiliary bishops
(all Roman rite)

Under each Ordinary is listed the auxiliary bishops whose tenure as such began during the tenure of such Ordinary.

Suffragan Bishops of Curitiba  
 José de Camargo Barros (1894.01.16 – 1903.11.09), next Bishop of São Paulo (Brazil) (1903.11.09 – death 1906.08.04)
 Leopoldo Duarte e Silva, (1904.05.10 – 1906.12.18), next last Suffragan Bishop of (his native) São Paulo, (see) promoted first Metropolitan Archbishop of São Paulo (Brazil) (1908.06.07 – death 1938.11.13)
 João Francisco Braga (later Archbishop) (1907.10.27 – 1926.05.10 see below), previously Bishop of Niterói (Brazil) (1902.04.09 – 1907.10.27)

Metropolitan Archbishops of Curitiba 
 João Francisco Braga (see above 1926.05.10 – 1935.06.22), emeritate as Titular Archbishop of Soteropolis (1935.06.22 – death 1937.10.13)
 Ático Eusébio da Rocha (1935.12.16 – death 1950.04.11), previously Bishop of Santa Maria(Brazil) (1922.10.27 – 1928.12.17), Bishop of Cafelândia (Brazil) (1928.12.17 – 1935.12.16)
BIOs TO ELABORATE
 Manoel da Silveira d’Elboux (1950.08.19 – 1970.02.06)
 Auxiliary Bishop: Inácio Krause (葛樂才), C.M. (1950 – 1963)
 Auxiliary Bishop: Gabriel Paulino Bueno Couto, O. Carm. (1954 – 1955), appointed Auxiliary Bishop of Taubaté, Sao Paulo
 Auxiliary Bishop: Jerônimo Mazzarotto (1957.04.29 – 1970.05.08)
 Auxiliary Bishop: Pedro Antônio Marchetti Fedalto (1966.05.30 – 1970.12.28), appointed Archbishop here
 Pedro Antônio Marchetti Fedalto (1970.12.28 – 2004.05.19)
 Auxiliary Bishop: Albano Bortoletto Cavallin (later Archbishop) (1973.06.14 – 1986.10.24), appointed Bishop of Guarapuava, Parana
 Auxiliary Bishop: Domingos Gabriel Wisniewski, C.M. (1975.06.27 – 1979.04.19), appointed Bishop of Cornélio Procópio, Parana
 Auxiliary Bishop: Ladislau Biernaski, C.M. (1979.04.19 – 2006.12.06), appointed Bishop of São José dos Pinhais, Parana
 Auxiliary Bishop: Sérgio Arthur Braschi (1998.02.18 – 2003.07.16), appointed Bishop of Ponta Grossa, Parana
 Moacyr José Vitti, Stigmatines (C.S.S.) (2004.05.19 – 2014.06.26)
 Auxiliary Bishop: Dirceu Vegini (2006.03.15 – 2010.10.20), appointed Bishop of Foz do Iguaçu, Parana
 Auxiliary Bishop: João Carlos Seneme, C.S.S. (2007.10.17 – 2013.06.26), appointed Bishop of Toledo, Parana
 Auxiliary Bishop: Rafael Biernaski (2010.02.10 – 2015.06.24), appointed Bishop of Blumenau, Santa Catarina
 Auxiliary Bishop: José Mário Scalon Angonese (2013.02.20 – 2017.05.31), appointed Bishop of Uruguaiana, Rio Grande do Sul
 José Antônio Peruzzo (2015.01.07 – ...), previously Bishop of Palmas–Francisco Beltrão (Brazil) (2005.08.24 – 2015.01.07)
 Auxiliary Bishop : Francisco Cota de Oliveira (2017.06.07 – 2020.06.10), Titular Bishop of Fiorentino (2017.06.07 – 2020.06.10), appointed Bishop of Sete Lagoas, Minas Gerais
 Auxiliary Bishop: Amilton Manoel da Silva, C.P. (2017.06.07 – 2020.05.06), Titular Bishop of Tusuros (2017.06.07 – 2020.05.06), appointed Bishop of Guarapuava

See also 
 List of Catholic dioceses in Brazil

Sources and external links 

 GCatholic.org, with Google map & satellite photo - data for all sections
 Archdiocese website (Portuguese)
 Catholic Hierarchy

Roman Catholic dioceses in Brazil

Roman Catholic ecclesiastical provinces in Brazil
Religious organizations established in 1892
Roman Catholic dioceses and prelatures established in the 19th century
Organisations based in Curitiba